Gheorghe "Gică" Popescu (born 9 October 1967) is a Romanian former professional football who played as a defender.

He notably played in La Liga where he is a former captain of FC Barcelona. He played for a string of European clubs in that period, including a four-year stint at PSV Eindhoven and winning the UEFA Cup with Galatasaray. He also played in the Premier League with Tottenham Hotspur, in Serie A with Lecce and in the Bundesliga with Hannover 96. In his native country he played for Universitatea Craiova, Steaua București and Dinamo București. In addition to his defensive skills, he was also capable of starting attacks deep from his own half.

His tactical knowledge as a defender made him a valuable team member in top European competitions until he reached his late-thirties. He was a key part of the Romania national team in the 1990s and earned 115 caps, scoring 16 goals. He was present at 1990 World Cup, 1994 World Cup, Euro 1996, 1998 World Cup and Euro 2000. He is the brother-in-law of fellow Romanian international Gheorghe Hagi.

Club career
After playing six seasons for Universitatea Craiova, Popescu was loaned to Romanian giants Steaua Bucharest reaching the semi-finals of the European Cup during their 1987–88 campaign. He moved abroad to the Netherlands in 1990, and signed for PSV Eindhoven at the request of Sir Bobby Robson, helping them to keep among the top Dutch sides, until he was transferred to Tottenham Hotspur in the Premier League on 9 September 1994 for a fee of £2.9million. He played 23 times in the Premier League and scored three goals as Spurs (who changed manager from Ossie Ardiles to Gerry Francis a few weeks after Popescu arrived) finished seventh in the league – their highest finish for five years. He also helped them to reach the FA Cup semi-finals, where they lost 4–1 to eventual cup winners Everton. However, after less than a year in England, he left Tottenham to sign for the Spanish club Barcelona for £3million, succeeding Ronald Koeman in the team. He was made captain of the Catalan club, contributing to their Copa del Rey (domestic cup) glory in his first season and their UEFA Cup Winners' Cup triumph in his second.

After leaving Barcelona during the summer of 1997, he was transferred to Galatasaray of Turkey, where he spent four years and won several major trophies, including the UEFA Cup in May 2000 – where Galatasaray defeated Arsenal, key rivals of his old club Tottenham, on penalties after a goalless draw in open play and he scored the final penalty shot in the penalty shootout. He spent the 2001–2002 season in Italy with Serie A club Lecce, before returning to his native Romania for a brief spell with Dinamo Bucharest, before winding up with a season in Germany with Hannover 96.

Popescu was never outside the top four in the Romanian Footballer of the Year awards for 13 years from 1989 until 2001. He was recently voted into Romanian footballs all-time World Cup team.

International career
At international level, Popescu is Romania's all-time third most capped players with 115, in which he scored 16 goals. He played for his country in the 1990, 1994, and 1998 World Cups, Euro 1996 and Euro 2000. He also entered the symbolic but exclusive circle of players with a century of caps.

Personal life 
He is the brother-in-law of fellow Romanian international Gheorghe Hagi.

Tax evasion and imprisonment 
On 4 March 2014, Popescu and seven others, among them Mihai Stoica, were convicted by a Romanian appeals court of money laundering and tax evasion in connection with the transfer of football players from Romania to other countries. Popescu was sentenced to a jail term of three years and one month. He was released for good conduct on 4 November 2015, after serving half of his sentence, the books he wrote and published during his imprisonment also helping towards his reduced sentence as customary for Romanian law.

Career statistics

Club

International

Scores and results list Romania's goal tally first, score column indicates score after each Popescu goal.

Honours
Steaua București
 Divizia A: 1987–88
 Cupa României: 1987–88

PSV
 Eredivisie: 1990–91, 1991–92
 Johan Cruijff Shield: 1992

Barcelona
 Copa del Rey: 1996–97
 Supercopa de España: 1996
 UEFA Cup Winners' Cup: 1996–97

Galatasaray
 1.Lig: 1997–98, 1998–99, 1999–2000
 Turkish Cup: 1998–99, 1999–2000
 Turkish Super Cup: 1997
 UEFA Cup: 1999–2000
 UEFA Super Cup: 2000

Individual
 Romanian Footballer of the Year: 1989, 1990, 1991, 1992, 1995, 1996

See also
 List of men's footballers with 100 or more international caps

References

Further reading

External links
 Gica Popescu's International caps
 
 

1967 births
Living people
Romanian footballers
Romania international footballers
1990 FIFA World Cup players
1994 FIFA World Cup players
1998 FIFA World Cup players
Expatriate footballers in the Netherlands
Expatriate footballers in England
Expatriate footballers in Spain
Expatriate footballers in Turkey
Expatriate footballers in Italy
Expatriate footballers in Germany
Romanian expatriate footballers
Romanian expatriate sportspeople in Spain
Romanian expatriate sportspeople in England
Romanian expatriate sportspeople in Germany
Bundesliga players
Galatasaray S.K. footballers
Süper Lig players
Eredivisie players
La Liga players
Premier League players
Serie A players
Liga I players
People from Calafat
Association football sweepers
Romanian expatriate sportspeople in the Netherlands
CS Universitatea Craiova players
FC Steaua București players
FC Dinamo București players
PSV Eindhoven players
Tottenham Hotspur F.C. players
FC Barcelona players
U.S. Lecce players
Hannover 96 players
UEFA Euro 1996 players
UEFA Euro 2000 players
FIFA Century Club
Romanian expatriate sportspeople in Turkey
Romanian white-collar criminals
UEFA Cup winning players
Romanian sports executives and administrators
Romanian expatriate sportspeople in Italy